Amicula is a genus of chitons belonging to the family Mopaliidae.

The species of this genus are found in Northern America.

Species:

Amicula amiculata 
Amicula gurjanovae 
Amicula vestita

References

Chitons